Stadionul Dinamo is a multi-use stadium in Chişinău, Moldova.  It is currently used mostly for football matches and is the home ground of FC Politehnica Chişinău.  The stadium holds 2,888 people.

References

Football venues in Moldova
Dynamo sports society
Sport in Chișinău
Buildings and structures in Chișinău